Vasco André Carvalho Braga (born 8 September 1993) is a Portuguese professional footballer who plays for F.C. Penafiel as a midfielder.

Club career
On 27 August 2017, Braga made his professional debut with Penafiel in a 2017–18 LigaPro match against Varzim.

References

External links

1993 births
Living people
People from Barcelos, Portugal
Portuguese footballers
Association football midfielders
Liga Portugal 2 players
Varzim S.C. players
Vilaverdense F.C. players
Merelinense F.C. players
F.C. Penafiel players
Sportspeople from Braga District